The 2007 NASCAR Busch Series was the twenty-sixth season of the NASCAR Busch Series. It began on February 17 with the Orbitz 300 at Daytona International Speedway and concluded on November 17 with the Ford 300 at Homestead-Miami Speedway. Carl Edwards clinched the Busch Series championship on November 3 during the O'Reilly Challenge with 2 races remaining. The 2007 season was the final season of the series under Anheuser-Busch's sponsorship. In 2008, the Busch Series became the NASCAR Nationwide Series sponsored by insurance company Nationwide Insurance with a $70 million contract for 7 years.

Top stories

Buschwhackers
The domination of the series by "Buschwhackers" continued in 2007. In the first 28 races, only two drivers not with regular Nextel Cup Series schedules drove their cars to victory from start to finish: Stephen Leicht (Meijer 300, Kentucky Speedway) and Jason Leffler (Kroger 200, O'Reilly Raceway Park). A third, Aric Almirola, was the official winner of the AT&T 250 at the Milwaukee Mile; Almirola qualified the car for Denny Hamlin who was racing at Sonoma in the Cup Series and was not scheduled to start, but was forced to as Hamlin was delayed in returning from Sonoma. Hamlin was placed in the car after arriving and drove nearly the entire race, winning, but he failed to receive credit because he failed to start. 32 of the 35 races were won by Cup Series drivers in 2007.

Meanwhile, Carl Edwards led Kevin Harvick by 733 points in the championship standings, a reversal from 2006 when Harvick beat Edwards by a record 824 points. At one time, Edwards' lead was 871 points prior to a stretch of five consecutive races outside the top 10 in the finishing order (in three of those races he finished 23rd or worse). There were more Busch only regulars near the top of the standings, but only because the Cup drivers ran fewer cumulative races than in 2006.

Owner's Championship
The Owner's Championship went to the No. 29 car of Richard Childress Racing driven by Scott Wimmer and Jeff Burton. This is currently only the second time in Busch Series history where the driver's and owner's points champions were different. The other instance also involved RCR and happened in 2003. Hendrick Motorsports driver Brian Vickers won the series points title as a driver, but RCR's No. 21 car earned more total points with Johnny Sauter and Kevin Harvick sharing the ride.

2008 NASCAR Nationwide Series
After 26 years of Anheuser-Busch sponsoring the series with their Busch Beer brand they decided not to renew their sponsorship for the 2008 season. Rumored sponsorship deals for the series included Subway, KFC,  Wal-Mart, And Culvers, however, those deals fell through. On October 10, 2007, chairman Brian France announced that insurance company Nationwide had signed a seven-year $60 million deal to sponsor the series. Nationwide also replaces Allstate as the official insurance company of NASCAR.

Schedule

The official 2007 Busch Series schedule was announced on October 2, 2006. The only major schedule change was the addition of the first NASCAR race in Canada at Circuit Gilles Villeneuve, which replaces last year's race at Martinsville. This marked the first time in Busch Series history that there are two consecutive road courses on the schedule. The order of races in July was also shuffled.

ESPN2 covered the majority of the Busch Series in 2007 with ESPN on ABC covering six races as part of the new television package.  The primary commentators for ESPN were Jerry Punch, Rusty Wallace and Andy Petree.

2007 team chart

Complete schedule

Part-time schedule

Races

Orbitz 300
The Orbitz 300 was held February 16 at Daytona International Speedway. Aric Almirola won the pole. Kevin Harvick won a relatively quick race from the 31st starting position. There were two early cautions: the first one on lap 4 for a three-car incident and the second one for "the Big One" on lap 16 involving 12 cars. The race was clean afterward. This was the first race televised on ESPN2 as part of the 2007 television package that lasted until 2014.

Top ten results:

Did not qualify: No. 1-J. J. Yeley, No. 22-David Stremme, No. 23-Brad Keselowski, No. 24-Casey Mears, No. 52-Brad Teague, No. 70-Justin Diercks

Stater Brothers 300
The Stater Brothers 300 was held February 24 at California Speedway. Dave Blaney won the pole, the first pole for Toyota in the Busch Series. The race had a short field of only 41 cars.

Top ten results:

Did not qualify: None.

Telcel-Motorola México 200
The Telcel-Motorola México 200 was held March 4 at Autódromo Hermanos Rodríguez.  The race was broadcast on ESPN2 in English and en español on ESPN Deportes. Scott Pruett won the pole. Juan Pablo Montoya made contact with his leading teammate Scott Pruett on a restart after coming back from a fuel-filler problem, spinning Pruett and going on to win the race, becoming the first non-American to win a NASCAR race since Ron Fellows in 2001.

Top ten results:

Did not qualify: Andy Pilgram (32).

Sam's Town 300
The Sam's Town 300 was held March 10 at Las Vegas Motor Speedway. Kevin Harvick won the pole. In a challenging race that was held on a newly banked racetrack, many teams, especially cup teams with drivers racing on Sunday, tried to find a setup that would work with their cars. Grip and aerodynamics became major issues as the race set a record for number of caution flags with 12 for 58 laps. This included a red flag with 10 laps to go for a hard crash into the wall by Reed Sorenson. Las Vegas natives, Kyle and Kurt Busch dominated the race, leading 123 of 200 laps, with 81 and 42 led respectively. However, Jeff Burton had been consistently quicker than the younger Busch and had taken the lead for 31 laps. Coming to the checkers, two-time Las Vegas winner Jeff Burton took his No. 29 Holiday Inn Chevy to the outside and banged fenders with Kyle who got loose under Burton and spun down on the apron and hit the outside wall after taking the second position. Out of respect for Busch leaving him room to pass, Jeff Burton pulled alongside Kyle's wrecked car to shake hands with him before going to victory lane and receive his checkered flag. This was the first NASCAR race broadcast on ABC since the 2000 Brickyard 400 seven years earlier.

Top ten results:

Did not qualify: No. 03-Curtis Cregan

Note: No. 52-Kevin Lepage withdrew from the race prior to qualifying.

Nicorette 300
The Nicorette 300 was held March 17 at Atlanta Motor Speedway. Kyle Busch won the pole. From the drop of the green flag, it appeared as though Kyle Busch would walk away with an easy victory. He proved his dominance by leading 143 of 195 laps. However, a loose lugnut after the final pit stop forced Busch to go to the tail end of the longest line, handing the lead to Jeff Burton. Burton would hold off RCR teammate Kevin Harvick for the win while Kyle Busch rallied to third after his penalty.

Top ten results:

Did not qualify: No. 34-Jay Sauter

Sharpie Mini 300
The Sharpie Mini 300 was held March 24 at Bristol Motor Speedway. Steve Wallace won his first career pole. This would be the last Busch Series race before Bristol would be repaved with new concrete and progressive banking. For the second consecutive week, Kyle Busch again proved he had the car to beat. He and series points leader Carl Edwards proved they had the cars to beat. The biggest controversy of the race came after a crash at lap 182 by David Reutimann. At the point of the crash, some of the leaders elected to come down pit road for tires and some gas on lap 188. Although the electronic light was green, signaling that pit road was open, the flagman near the light was still waving the pit road closed flag. The pit crews of Ryan Newman, Carl Edwards, and Dale Earnhardt Jr. argued with NASCAR officials about the call. Eventually, NASCAR controversially decided to let all of the cars pit and maintain their position in the field. After the confusion was sorted out, Busch took off with Edwards in pursuit. However, Mike Wallace, running on the tail end of the lead lap (Mike was in front of the leader), jumbled up the 9th restart. Mike's mistake forced Edwards into the rear bumper of Kyle Busch. Edwards would inherit the lead and would hold off teammate Matt Kenseth for his first win since Gateway in 2006.

Top ten results:

Did not qualify: None only 43 entries.

Pepsi 300
The Pepsi 300 was held April 7 at Nashville Superspeedway. David Stremme won the pole. From the drop of the green flag, it appeared as though new manufacturer Toyota would steal the show and walk off with its first Busch Series win. However, Carl Edwards spoiled the party, coming back from a loose wheel penalty to pass Busch regular Jason Leffler with 25 laps to go to win his second consecutive race and extend his points lead.

Top ten results:

Did not qualify: None only 43 entries.

O'Reilly 300
The O'Reilly 300 was held April 14 at Texas Motor Speedway. David Ragan won his first career Busch Pole Award. The race, for the third time of the season, was dominated again by Kyle Busch, who hoped to turn his strong runs into a win. However, that day would not come as an unlucky caution during a green flag pit stop would again cost Kyle the victory. Former Formula 1 driver Juan Pablo Montoya appeared to have his second Busch Series win in the bag until he hit the clutch during a pit stop, leaving him with a loose lugnut. Juan would tangle with fellow rookie Marcos Ambrose and finish 30th. Denny Hamlin would hold the lead until Matt Kenseth, who had recovered from an early spin, took the lead with 11 laps left and would go on to win in Texas.

Top ten results:

Did not qualify: No. 80-Robert Richardson Jr.

Bashas' Supermarkets 200
The Bashas' Supermarkets 200 was held April 20 at Phoenix International Raceway. Kyle Busch won the pole. The early portion of the race was dominated again by Busch. However, lady luck would, for the fourth time this season, deal Busch a bad hand. While running fifth after a restart, Busch attempted to pass Ryan Newman and thought he had cleared him. However, Busch came back down on Ryan's front bumper and they both ended up crashing. Running a partial schedule, Clint Bowyer would dominate the race, leading 120 of the 200 laps. His only contender seemed to be Matt Kenseth, who had previously passed Bowyer with 33 to go but Bowyer passed him back with 14 to go and held on to win his first race since Dover last fall.

Top ten results:

Did not qualify: No. 50-Brian Pannone

Aaron's 312
The Aaron's 312 was held on April 28 at Talladega Superspeedway. Brad Coleman captured his first NASCAR pole. The race itself was an exciting one to watch. Dale Earnhardt Jr. was the dominant car of the day until his transmission broke on a lap 95 restart. Kyle Busch's streak of bad luck would continue as on lap 26, Tony Stewart made contact with Kyle Busch's left rear fender sending Kyle into the wall on the backstretch. Busch took a wild ride as the car slid across the track into the grass and flipped several times. From there, many cars, including surprises Kyle Krisiloff, and Juan Pablo Montoya were in contention for the win. But Tony Stewart, who was aiming to avenge his spectacular flip from one year ago, took the lead from Casey Mears with help from Kevin Harvick, Inc. teammate Bobby Labonte. However, Labonte pulled aside Stewart coming to the checkered flag in the trial to win his first Busch Series race since 1998.

Top ten results:

Did not qualify: None only 42 entries.

Circuit City 250
The Circuit City 250 presented by Funai was held on May 4 at Richmond International Raceway. Denny Hamlin won the pole. In the Busch Series' first Friday night shootout of the season, Kevin Harvick aimed to make it a four-peat of consecutive wins at RIR. From the outset, pole-sitter Denny Hamlin dominated but was taken out early by Matt Kenseth. From there, Kenseth, Jeff Burton, and Clint Bowyer established themselves as the frontrunners. Matt Kenseth looked to have the race locked up until J. J. Yeley spun on lap 222 and cut Kenseth's 2-second lead. During the final pit stop of the night, Kenseth had a mishap with the jack and came out behind Bowyer and Burton. On the last restart of the night, Bowyer pulled away from Kenseth and Buron to snap Harvick's win streak but give owner Richard Childress his fourth consecutive victory at RIR.

Top ten results:

Did not qualify: No. 0-Eric McClure

Diamond Hill Plywood 200
The Diamond Hill Plywood 200 was held May 11 at Darlington Raceway. Denny Hamlin captured his first win of the season from the pole.

Top ten results:

Did not qualify: No. 52-Kevin Lepage

Carquest Auto Parts 300
The Carquest Auto Parts 300 was held May 26 at Lowe's Motor Speedway. Matt Kenseth won the pole. From the drop of the green, pit strategy played into the race. Although he was not running on fresh tires, Kurt Busch amazingly made his tires last for most of the race en route to leading the most laps. However, Busch's day would end as he would end up hitting the wall on lap 148. This accident gave the top 2 positions to Casey Mears and Kasey Kahne. Both drivers needed to rebound heavily from a struggling Nextel Cup season, and both wanted to carry any momentum from this race over into the 600. However, it was the latter Kasey who held off the competition to win his first NASCAR race since October.

Top ten results:

Did not qualify: No. 0-Eric McClure, No. 32-Bill Elliott, No. 72-Kevin Lepage, No. 95-Blake Feese

Dover 200
The Dover 200 was held June 2 at Dover International Speedway. Denny Hamlin won the pole. The race would end up being dominated by Carl Edwards, whom many had dubbed the "Concrete Carl" for his victories on concrete. True to his nickname, Edwards dominated the race, leading for 122 of the 200 laps.

Top ten results:

Did not qualify: None only 43 entries.

Federated Auto Parts 300
The Federated Auto Parts 300 presented by Dollar General was held June 9 at Nashville Superspeedway. Steve Wallace won the pole. This race was seen as an opportunity for Busch Series regulars to upset the Cup drivers who had to fly from Pocono to Nashville. Although Carl Edwards had no seat time in a car practiced by Matt McCall, he laid down the 7th quickest lap time. From the drop of the green, the race was a good mix of contending Busch regulars and Cup stars. Although Clint Bowyer seemed to have the car to beat, it was Edwards who had the upper hand and recorded his second consecutive win.

Top ten results:

Did not qualify: No. 05-Justin Ashburn

Meijer 300
The Meijer 300 presented by Oreo was held June 16 at Kentucky Speedway. Regan Smith won his first career pole (even after hitting a seagull on his second qualifying lap), making it seven different pole winners in seven races. Many Busch regulars, including Smith, were aspiring to end the Cup drivers' parade by pulling out a victory. From the drop of the green, it looked as though Smith would be the class of the field. However, a refiring problem during a pit stop cost him 2 laps, but amazingly rallied back. The race, unfortunately for the Busch regulars, would be handed to Carl Edwards. Edwards again dominated the race and looked to have it in hand until he was tagged by Steve Wallace on a restart. It was Stephen Leicht who downed the Buschwhackers and fulfilled that dream to earn his 1st career Busch Series victory.

Top ten results:

Did not qualify: No. 76-Jerick Johnson

AT&T 250

The AT&T 250 took place on June 23 at The Milwaukee Mile. Aric Almirola won the pole, but in an interesting twist, the No. 20's regular driver, Denny Hamlin, was late getting back from Sonoma, so Almirola took the green flag. The race would be again dominated by Carl Edwards, who was looking to bounce back from his worst finish of the year (33rd at Kentucky). Edwards had the field covered, leading for 123 laps until an unscheduled pit stop forced Edwards down pit road and pinned him a lap down. A tough decision had to be made by Dave Rogers, crew chief on the 20. Hamlin had arrived on the track at lap 43, and Almirola was still running in third. Rogers decided to put Hamlin in the car at lap 59 instead of leaving Almirola in it. The decision, although tough, paid off as Hamlin held off Wisconsin native Scott Wimmer to cross the start/finish line in first, but Almirola was credited with his first career NASCAR Busch Series victory. Hamlin also became the first relief driver to finish first since Jack Ingram handed his car over to Harry Gant at Darlington Raceway and finished first.

Top ten results:

Did not qualify: None.

Note: Denny Hamlin came in for Almirola on lap 60 and finished first. The win, points, and earnings were given to Almirola.

Camping World 200 presented by RVs.com
The Camping World 200 presented by RVs.com was held June 30 at New Hampshire International Speedway. Kevin Harvick won the pole. Harvick established that he had the car to beat throughout the race. This domination was highlighted by the fact that he led 166 of 200 laps. The race included a short red flag for a crash involving J. J. Yeley and Marcos Ambrose. Juan Pablo Montoya, coming off his first ever Cup victory and with a new crew chief in Brian Pattie, was taken out by Clint Bowyer on lap 165, setting up the run to the finish. Although points leader Carl Edwards tried many times to pass Harvick, he would settle for second. In an ironic twist, Harvick, driving the No. 21 Chevy, became the 21st different winner in 21 Busch Series races at NHIS. After the race Carl Edwards suffered a 25-point penalty for the use of illegal shocks found after the race.

Top ten results:

Did not qualify: None.

Note: An accident in practice sent No. 52-Ian Henderson home as he did not have a backup car and was unable to make repairs.

Winn-Dixie 250
The Winn-Dixie 250 presented by PepsiCo was held July 6 at Daytona International Speedway. Jason Leffler won the pole. The race was postponed to July 7 due to a rainstorm that cancelled Bud Pole Qualifying for the Nextel Cup Series race to be held there. Throughout the season, Kyle Busch had been hampered by terrible luck, either through faulty pit stops, penalties, or crashes. However, on this day, it looked as though, again, Busch had the car to beat. But this time, he finished the deal in style, holding off Daytona 500 winner Kevin Harvick and Dave Blaney for his first win of the season.

Top ten results:

Did not qualify: Morgan Shepherd (89).

USG Durock 300
The USG Durock 300 was held on July 14 at Chicagoland Speedway. Denny Hamlin won the pole. Fresh off of his first victory of the season, Kyle Busch would again take command of the race. However, this race featured many contending drivers, including the likes of Matt Kenseth,  Busch Series points leader Carl Edwards, and the Richard Childress Racing trio of Jeff Burton, Kevin Harvick, and Clint Bowyer. The race would feature many twists, including many of the above-mentioned drivers struggling to simply get onto pit road for a pit stop. For Burton, his problem was heavily documented by ABC as he was enduring 100-degree heat inside his car without a working AC system. Eventually, the moment of the race would be decided under a caution flag. As Kyle Busch, who was leading the race, ducked down pit road, it appeared as though all of the leaders would follow suit. However, the other leaders faked the dominant Busch onto pit road, forcing the frustrated driver to rally to 5th by the end. Up front, Kevin Harvick pulled away from Matt Kenseth to become the first Busch Series repeat winner at Chicagoland.

Top ten results:

Did not qualify: No. 05-Justin Ashburn, No. 58-Chris Horn

Gateway 250
The Gateway 250 was held July 21 at Gateway International Raceway. Scott Wimmer won his first career pole. The race would feature many "young guns", or drivers who had a lot of talent but no experience. Featuring over 19 rookies, including the likes of Landon Cassill, development driver for Hendrick Motorsports, Travis Kittleson and Brad Coleman, driving for Joe Gibbs Racing, Third-generation driver Brad Keselowski, among others. However, with a high number of young drivers in the field, mixed with a difficult racetrack would combine to form many caution flags. However, Reed Sorenson, who had won at GIR in 2005, was looking to snap his 61-race losing streak. He would do so, avoiding accidents, and even coming back from an unscheduled green flag pit stop to take his first victory of the season.

Top ten results:

Did not qualify: No. 44-Mike Harmon.

Kroger 200
The Kroger 200 benefiting Riley Hospital for Children was held on July 28 at O'Reilly Raceway Park. Aric Almirola won the pole. Fresh from qualifying at the Brickyard, the Nextel Cup drivers converged with the Busch regulars at ORP. The race would be dominated by Greg Biffle, who is in the midst of a dismal year. Biffle showed the field that he had not lost any talent, leading 94 of the 200 laps. However, Busch regular Jason Leffler would trump the "Buschwhackers" with a pass on Biffle with 2 to go. Leffler would hold on the get his second career victory since 2004 and the historic first win for Toyota in a stock car.

Top ten results:

Did not qualify: No. 00-Mike Potter

Note: Following the race, Greg Biffle was fined $5,000 and place on probation until December 17 for failing to meet his post-race media obligations.

NAPA Auto Parts 200
The inaugural NAPA Auto Parts 200 presented by Dodge took place on August 4 at Circuit Gilles Villeneuve in Montréal, Quebec, Canada. This was the Busch Series second international road course and the first time that any of NASCAR's top three series has gone to Canada. Canadian native and ex-Champ Car driver Patrick Carpentier won his first career pole. The race would be dominated by former V8 Supercars champion and Busch Series rookie Marcos Ambrose. However, road course ringers such as Scott Pruett and Niclas Jönsson, "Buschwhackers" Carl Edwards, Robby Gordon, and Kevin Harvick, along with Canadian natives Ron Fellows and Carpentier. The race was predicted to be a wreckfest due to the many hard braking points along the circuit. However, there were only five caution flags, with three for blown engines. With the race winding down, many drivers tried desperate moves to get to the front. The excitement started when Harvick tangled with road course ringers Pruett and Fellows, causing a major pileup involving the likes of Jeff Burton, Brad Coleman, and Andy Pilgrim. However, Robby Gordon was thought to have made the winning pass of Ambrose in Turn 3 before Ambrose spun Gordon out. During the ensuing caution, Gordon had not maintained the minimum speed limit to maintain one's position, and was to be placed behind Ron Fellows. Gordon, however, could not find Fellows' car and was black-flagged. In an unsurprising move, Gordon bumped back Ambrose and spun him out, handing the race lead to Kevin Harvick. Going from last to first, and being on a shaky fuel mileage strategy, Harvick held off polesitter Carpentier to win the inaugural Busch Series race in Montreal.  Gordon was disqualified from his position, and suspended for the Nextel Cup Pennsylvania 500 the following day. Two days later, Gordon was docked $35,000 (US), and was placed on probation for the rest of 2007. Once the caution came out on Lap 72 the field was frozen. Once the field is frozen, all cars must maintain cautious pace in order to be scored. At the time that the field was frozen, the 59 was in the lead.  The 55 did not maintain cautious pace and by NASCAR rules, cars not maintaining cautious pace are scored only when they blend back into the continuous line. The 55 based on our scoring was ordered to blend back in behind the 33 [and] in front of the 7. The tower ordered the 55 multiple times to get into position. The directive was acknowledged by the crew chief of the 55 and the crew chief also communicated the order to the driver of the 55. The driver ignored NASCAR’s directive. He was warned that he would be black-flagged if he did not comply. Once the 55 crossed the start-finish line he was posted per the NASCAR rule book and at that time the directive to display the black flag was given. After contact with the 59 on Lap 73, NASCAR took emergency action per the rule book Section 12-2 thus parking the 55, which was also ignored. The black flag with the white cross was displayed to the 55 when it crossed the start-finish line on Lap 74. The 55 finished the race in the 18th position. Patrick Carpentier, who finished 2nd suffered a 25 point penalty for an unapproved adjustment on his car found during post-race inspection.

Top ten results:

Did not qualify: No. 4 Regan Smith

Zippo 200 at The Glen
The Zippo 200 at The Glen was held August 11 at Watkins Glen International. Kurt Busch won the pole. This is the final road course on the Busch Series schedule. Busch would dominate early, but the entire race changed when road course ringer Max Papis blew an engine on lap 2. Pit strategy was key at this point as many chose to pit for fresh tires. One of those was Montreal winner Kevin Harvick, who took command on lap 50 and never looked back as he won his second consecutive road course race, and tied Jack Ingram for second on the all-time wins list with 31.

Top ten results:

Did not qualify: None only 41 entries.

CarFax 250
The CarFax 250 was held August 18 at Michigan International Speedway. Greg Biffle won the pole. From the drop of the green flag, it was established that the two best cars belonged to Matt Kenseth and Denny Hamlin. Taking advantage of the multi-grooved racetrack, the two swapped lines almost every lap. However, the bigger story of the day was with Busch Series points leader Carl Edwards. Although his points lead in drivers standings was immense, that was not the case for owners points, as his two consecutive finishes of 30th or worse put the No. 29 car of Richard Childress Racing only 41 points behind.  Edwards was hoping to get his season back on track. However, that was not to be as he got loose off of turn 2 and lost a lap, giving him another 30th or worse finish. While Edwards struggled, Hamlin dominated the race, leading 69 laps en route to his second win of the season.

Top ten results:

Did not qualify: No. 0-Eric McClure, No. 71-Ron Young

Food City 250
The Food City 250 was held on August 24 at Bristol Motor Speedway. Jason Leffler won the pole. Based on the racing that the truck race provided, the Busch race was expected to be no different with the use of the outside lane and more two wide racing. From the green, it appeared as though Jeff Burton would have the car to beat. However, his night ended abruptly when Eric McClure blew a right front tire in front of Burton, handing the lead back to Leffler. Pit strategy and tires were key in this race, as the lead was traded between Kyle Busch, Leffler, David Reutimann, and Ryan Newman. One highlight of the race was when the red flag came out during the middle of this race for a hard crash between rookie Marcos Ambrose and Robert Richardson Jr. Busch's shot at victory would end with a controversial commitment line violation, although commentator Andy Petree noted that Busch did fake going onto pit road. Back at the front, the lead had been given to Ryan Newman, who was on 170 lap old tires. However, the cars of Kasey Kahne, Jason Leffler, and David Reutimann were all lurking in Newmans mirror. Finally, with 10 laps to go, Kahne made a daring three wide pass on Newman and Leffler going into turn one. The inevitable contact ruined Newman's right front tire, ending his night. Surprisingly, with 5 laps to go, NASCAR on ESPN lost its satellite feed, ruining the suspenseful finish for TV viewers. ESPN came back with Kahne taking the checkered flag and Leffler spinning across the line in second after a tap from Reutimann.

Top ten results:

Did not qualify: No. 49-Derrike Cope, No. 54-Brad Teague

NOTE: The No. 08 of Jason White withdrew his entry after a crash in practice.

Camping World 300 presented by RVs.com
The Camping World 300 presented by RVs.com was held on September 2 at California Speedway. Denny Hamlin won the pole. At the start, the dominant cars of the race belonged to Jimmie Johnson, Brian Vickers, Hamlin, and Jeff Burton. Many felt that Vickers' No. 10 Toyota was the car to beat. However, late in the race, his tires wore out on him and Vickers was later involved in a late race crash, involving Stephen Leicht, spring race winner Matt Kenseth, and Busch Series points leader Carl Edwards. The race took a scary turn when the car of Brad Keselowski was involved in a fiery four-car incident involving A. J. Allmendinger, Eric McClure and J. J. Yeley. Keselowski was later airlifted to the hospital for a bruised leg. Afterwards, the lead would be traded between Burton, Kyle Busch, and polesitter Denny Hamlin. On the fifth caution flag of the night, Burton, knowing he would be 3 laps short on fuel, decided to come down pit road and take on fresh tires while Busch stayed out and inherited the lead. Burton's strategy worked as he passed Busch with 8 laps to go and held on for his third win of the season.

Top ten results:

Did not qualify: None only 42 entries.

Emerson Radio 250
The Emerson Radio 250 was held September 8 at Richmond International Raceway. Kyle Busch won the pole. From the drop of the green, it was established that Busch had the car to beat. The only other car that could challenge the nearly unstoppable Busch was that of Matt Kenseth, who led for 17 laps before spinning late to avoid a spinning Paul Menard. The red flag was brought out late for a blown engine by Derrike Cope. Kyle Busch took command after the red flag and would lead a total of 225 laps en route to his second victory at RIR.

Top ten results:

Did not qualify: No. 0-Eric McClure, No. 89-Morgan Shepherd

RoadLoans.com 200
The RoadLoans.com 200 was held September 22 at Dover International Speedway. Greg Biffle won the pole. During NASCAR on ESPN's broadcast, it was documented that Denny Hamlin had a case of the flu and had future teammate Kyle Busch standing by. The other story of the day was the amount of so-called "young guns" such as Brad Keselowski, Steve Wallace, Danny Efland, Kyle Krisiloff, and development drivers Landon Cassill and Brad Keselowski. The high number of these young drivers combined with the tricky and physically demanding "Monster Mile" made into a crashfest, including 13 caution flags. The big highlight of the race was when Robby Gordon was attempting to block the No. 41 of Reed Sorenson. Tony Raines was clipped by Gordon. In a fit of rage, and due to the fact that Tony's sponsor, RoadLoans.com, was sponsoring the race, exited his car, and threw his helmet at Gordon. However, the helmet missed and bounced off another car. Raines received a 25-point penalty after the race. In the melee, many strong cars, such as those of polesitter Biffle and Mike Bliss had pit problems early on, but both rallied to finish fourth and ninth, respectively. However, making no mistakes at all was Denny Hamlin, who avoided the carnage to dominate, leading 138 of 200 laps, holding off hometown hero Martin Truex Jr. for his third win of the season.

Top ten results:

Did not qualify: None only 43 entries.

Yellow Transportation 300
The Yellow Transportation 300 was held on September 29 at Kansas Speedway. Matt Kenseth won the pole. This was a historic race for veteran Jason Keller because when he took the green flag for this race, it marked his 417th Busch Series start, tying Tommy Houston for 1st on the all time starts list. From the start, Kenseth established himself as the car to beat. While Kenseth led, other drivers had trouble. Seemingly out of his slump, points leader Carl Edwards experienced trouble again, in the form of a cut tire sending him into the wall with just under 50 laps to go. Kenseth's domination was short lived, however, as cars such as those of Emporia native Clint Bowyer and Kyle Busch came to life. Busch was especially determined as he was forced to rally from an early speeding penalty. On the final restart with 14 to go, Kenseth and Busch would have a shootout to the checkered flag, with Busch prevailing by .085 thousandths of a second.

Top ten results:

Did not qualify: No. 44-Jennifer Jo Cobb, No. 89-Morgan Shepherd

Note: The No. 61 of Josh Krug did not make an attempt due to a crash in practice.

Dollar General 300
The Dollar General 300 was held on October 12 at Lowe's Motor Speedway. By taking the green flag for the race, Jason Keller became the all time starts leader in the NASCAR Busch Series with 418. Greg Biffle won the pole. With the craziness of the previous year's race, much of the same was expected out of this year's race. The combination of a freshly paved racetrack, hard Goodyear tires, and a famously loose turn 4, the race became one of survival as driver after driver spun. Another top storyline was the "fight" for the drivers championship. Carl Edwards simply needed David Reutimann to struggle to wrap up the championship. To the surprise of ESPN analyst Andy Petree, most of the driver who caused the cautions were Cup drivers in the Chase. "The Big One" was surprisingly triggered by 2nd place in Nextel Cup points Jimmie Johnson, who spun alone in turn 2, collecting points leader Edwards, Matt Kenseth, Keller, and Kentucky winner Stephen Leicht. Other wrecks involved polesitter Biffle and Clint Bowyer, although the latter was able to rally for an eighth-place finish. While the wrecks were taking place, Jeff Burton, forced to the back because of an engine change, steadily worked his way through the field, taking the lead on lap 169. He would not look back as he held off Kyle Busch and Dale Earnhardt Jr. for his third win at Lowe's.

Top ten results:

Did not qualify: No. 0-Eric McClure, No. 61-Travis Kittleson, No. 72-D. J. Kennington

Sam's Town 250
The Sam's Town 250 was held October 27 at Memphis Motorsports Park. Marcos Ambrose won his first NASCAR career pole. This race marked the Busch Series debut of 2007 Indianapolis 500 winner and 2007 IndyCar season champion Dario Franchitti, as well as Rolex Sports Car Series driver Colin Braun. Also, 18-year-old Chase Austin became the first African-American to start a Busch Series race since Bill Lester in 1999. The race would be dominated by crashes, including one that thwarted Edwards' bid to lock up the championship. Through all the wrecks, a previously winless Reutimann dominated the race, holding off Mike Bliss and David Ragan on a green-white-checkered finish to win his first career Busch Series race and the second for Toyota on a short track. The race was slowed by 25 cautions, a record for the year and 1 caution short of the Series all-time record. Ron Young, who finished 17th, suffered a 50-point penalty after illegal shock absorbers were found during post-race inspection.

Top ten results:

Did not qualify: No. 01-Kertus Davis, No. 12-Marc Mitchell, No. 44-Mike Harmon, No. 52-Chris Lawson, No. 54-Carl Long, No. 89-Morgan Shepherd

O'Reilly Challenge
The O'Reilly Challenge was held November 3 at Texas Motor Speedway. Memphis winner David Reutimann earned his first career pole. Tony Stewart dominated the day, leading 144 laps. However, a collision with the lapped car of Kyle Krisiloff put him in 16th place after repairs to his car, later rallying to 7th. Greg Biffle would pass Denny Hamlin on lap 140 for the lead, it seemed he was on his way to his first Busch Series victory of the season but he pitted on lap 166 for what he thought was a flat tire but later it turned out that the tire was fine. Kevin Harvick would take over the top spot, easily holding off Kyle Busch for his third consecutive fall Texas win. Carl Edwards clinched the championship and finished 11th in the race.

Top ten results:

Did not qualify: No. 05-Brett Rowe, No. 44-Mike Harmon, No. 72-D. J. Kennington

Arizona.Travel 200
The Arizona.Travel 200 was held November 10 at Phoenix International Raceway. Clint Bowyer won his first pole of the season. The race was slowed by 11 cautions and 2 red flags. Kyle Busch dominated the race leading 132 laps and holding off Matt Kenseth (who had lost his power steering) on a green-white-checkered finish. This race marked the end of Kyle Busch's 4 year Busch Series career at Hendrick Motorsports as Mark Martin drove the No. 5 at the Homestead-Miami race. Beginning in 2008 Kyle Busch will drive for Joe Gibbs Racing. Matt Kenseth suffered a 25-point penalty for unapproved adjustments found during post-race inspection.

Top ten results:

Did not qualify: No. 0-Eric McClure, No. 34-Brian Pannone, No. 44-Jennifer Jo Cobb, No. 89-Morgan Shepherd

Ford 300

The Ford 300 was held November 17 at Homestead-Miami Speedway. David Ragan won the pole (David chose to start the race in the outside lane rather than the inside lane; all pole winners are given this option in NASCAR races). This was the final race with Anheuser-Busch sponsorship, and Carl Edwards was officially crowned the 2007 and final Busch Series champion, as Nationwide Insurance takes over in 2008.  Jeff Burton would take the final checkered flag of 2007 and with it, Richard Childress' third owner's championship.

Top ten results:

Did not qualify: No. 0-Eric McClure, No. 01-Kertus Davis, No. 44-Jennifer Jo Cobb, No. 72-D. J. Kennington

Final standings

Drivers 
The top 10

Full Drivers' Championship
(key) Bold – Pole position awarded by time. Italics – Pole position set by owner's points. * – Most laps led.

Declaring for points in one series: Rules change for 2011
This was the fourth-to-last season where Cup Series drivers could run for points in another series. NASCAR implemented this change after Cup drivers were winning the Busch/Nationwide championships over the series regulars for 5 years straight (2006-2010). If the change had been implemented for the 2007 season, Leffler would have been the champion. The rest of the top 10 in the standings would have been Hamilton Jr. in 2nd, Leicht, Ambrose, Mike Wallace (who finished 11th in points), Scott Wimmer (14th), Kyle Krisiloff (18th), Steve Wallace (19th), Mike Bliss (21st), and Brent Sherman (23rd).

Wimmer and Bliss were only running part-time in 2007 and they still would have finished in the top 10 in points. Sherman was released from his ride (the No. 36 for McGill Motorsports) with five races to go in the season, and he too would have finished in the top 10 in points.

See also
2007 NASCAR NEXTEL Cup Series
2007 NASCAR Craftsman Truck Series
2007 NASCAR Busch East Series
2007 NASCAR Canadian Tire Series
2007 NASCAR Corona Series

References

NASCAR Xfinity Series seasons